Jakub Kamiński (born 5 June 2002) is a Polish professional footballer who plays for Bundesliga club VfL Wolfsburg and the Poland national team as a left winger.

Club career

Lech Poznań
As a junior, he started his career in Szombierki Bytom, before joining Lech Poznań's academy in 2015. Climbing through the ranks with junior squads and the reserve team, he was first included in the first team roster in early 2019 by Adam Nawałka.

He made his Ekstraklasa debut on 20 September 2019 in a 1–1 home draw against Jagiellonia Białystok, in the starting line-up. His first league goal came in a 3–3 away draw against Zagłębie Lubin on 6 June 2020. On 16 September 2020, he scored his first goal in European competitions against Hammarby IF in a 0–3 Europa League qualifying round away win. Following a successful 2021–22 campaign, which saw Lech win the championship on the club's 100th anniversary, he was voted Ekstraklasa's Young Player of the Season.

Wolfsburg
On 10 January 2022, Kamiński signed a five-year contract with Bundesliga club VfL Wolfsburg, effective from 1 July 2022.

International career
He made his debut for the Poland national football team on 5 September 2021 in a World Cup qualifier against San Marino, a 7–1 away victory. He started and played the whole match.

Career statistics

Club

International

Scores and results list Poland's goal tally first.

Honours

Club
Lech Poznań
 Ekstraklasa: 2021–22

Individual
Ekstraklasa Best Player: 2021
Ekstraklasa Young Player of the Season: 2021–22
Ekstraklasa Player of the Month: October 2021
Ekstraklasa Young Player of the Month: July 2021, October 2021

References

External links
 
 

Polish footballers
2002 births
Living people
Sportspeople from Ruda Śląska
Poland youth international footballers
Poland under-21 international footballers
Poland international footballers
Association football wingers
Lech Poznań II players
Lech Poznań players
VfL Wolfsburg players
Ekstraklasa players
II liga players
III liga players
2022 FIFA World Cup players
Polish expatriate footballers
Expatriate footballers in Germany
Polish expatriate sportspeople in Germany